Cătălin Sergiu Lichioiu (born 20 January 1981) is a Romanian former footballer. He had notable stints in the Moldovan National Division, Ukrainian Premier League, and the Canadian Soccer League.

Playing career 
Lichioiu began his career in 2001 with his hometown club Tractorul Brașov in the Divizia C. In 2003, he was transferred to FC Nistru Otaci of the Moldovan National Division. During his tenure with Nistru he won the Moldovan Cup, and finished as top league goal scorer in the 2004-2005 season. He featured in the 2005–06 UEFA Cup against Grazer AK. In 2006, he signed with Vorskla Poltava of the Ukrainian Premier League, where he appeared in 38 matches and recorded four goals.

In 2008, & 2011 he had stints with FC Vostok, and FC Zaria Bălți. In 2011, he returned to Nistru Otaci where he appeared in 48 matches, and scored four goals. In 2013, he went abroad to Canada to sign with Kingston FC of the Canadian Soccer League. He had a successful debut season where he recorded ten goals, and won the regular season championship. In the postseason he contributed by scoring a goal in the semi-final match against London City, which advanced Kingston to the CSL Championship final. In the finals the club faced SC Waterloo, but suffered a 3-1 defeat. In 2014, his contract was renewed on March 19, 2014. In 2015, Kingston ceased operations as a result terminated all player contracts.

References 

1981 births
Living people
Canadian Soccer League (1998–present) players
Romanian footballers
Romanian expatriate footballers
Association football forwards
FC Nistru Otaci players
Moldovan Super Liga players
Kingston FC players
FC Vostok players
FC Vorskla Poltava players
CSF Bălți players
Expatriate soccer players in Canada
Ukrainian Premier League players
Romanian expatriate sportspeople in Ukraine
Kazakhstan Premier League players
Sportspeople from Brașov